Johan Kleppe (29 September 1928 – 17 May 2022) was a Norwegian veterinarian and politician for the Liberal Party.

He was elected to the Norwegian Parliament from Nordland in 1969, but was not re-elected in 1973. He had previously served in the position of deputy representative during the term 1965–1969.

He was the Minister of Defence in 1972–1973 during the cabinet Korvald, having formerly been State Secretary to the Minister of Agriculture from 1968 to 1969 during the cabinet Borten. During his time in cabinet he was replaced in the Norwegian Parliament by Kristian Halse. Kleppe authored one book on defence policy, published in 1973.

On the local level he was member of Bjørnskinn municipal council from 1955 to 1963, and then its successor municipality Andøy from 1963 to 1978, serving as deputy mayor from 1963 to 1966 and mayor from 1966 to 1969 and 1975 to 1978.

Kleppe died on 17 May 2022, at the age of 93.

References

External links

1928 births
2022 deaths
Members of the Storting
Norwegian state secretaries
Liberal Party (Norway) politicians
Mayors of places in Nordland
Norwegian School of Veterinary Science alumni
Norwegian veterinarians
20th-century Norwegian politicians
People from Andøy
Defence ministers of Norway